The Indian National Open Athletics Championships is an annual outdoor track and field competition, organised by the Athletics Federation of India, which serves as the national championship for the sport in India. It was first held as a national championship in 1961. The 1994 championship was an international event, as foreign athletes were invited to participate as part of the opening of the Jawaharlal Nehru Stadium.

Men

100 metres
1988: Canute Meghalaes
1989: Anand Shetty
1990: Selvaraj Roberts
1991: Selvaraj Roberts
1992: Selvaraj Roberts
1993: M. S. Sridharan
1994: 
1995: ?
1996: Amit Khanna
1997: ?
1998: Amit Khanna
1999: Anil Kumar Prakash
2000: Sachin Navale
2001: Anil Kumar Prakash
2002: Sanjay Ghosh
2003: Vilas Nilgund
2004: Piyush Kumar
2005: Anil Kumar Prakash

200 metres
1988: Anand Shetty
1989: Arjun Devaiah
1990: Arjun Devaiah
1991: Selvaraj Roberts
1992: Anand Natarajan
1993: Anand Natarajan
1994: 
1995: ?
1996: Amit Khanna
1997: ?
1998: Ajay Raj Singh
1999: Anil Kumar Prakash
2000: Clifford Joshua
2001: Anil Kumar Prakash
2002: Anand Menezes
2003: Piyush Kumar
2004: Anil Kumar Prakash
2005: Alaguvel Arvind

400 metres
1988: Vijaya Kumaran
1989: Arjun Devaiah
1990: Chellappan Muralidharan
1991: B. Salju
1992: Jata Shankar
1993: Avtar Singh
1994: 
1995: ?
1996: Dinesh Rawat
1997: ?
1998: Paramjit Singh
1999: K. J. Manoj Lal
2000: Anil Kumar Rohil
2001: K. J. Manoj Lal
2002: K. J. Manoj Lal
2003: K. J. Manoj Lal
2004: Sarish Paul
2005: P. S. Sreejith

800 metres
1988: Budhwa Oraon
1989: Sukhcharan Singh
1990: Avtar Singh
1991: Vijaya Kumaran
1992: Avtar Singh
1993: Avtar Singh
1994: 
1995: ?
1996: Anil Kumar Minz
1997: ?
1998: K. J. Manoj Lal
1999: K. J. Manoj Lal
2000: P. Jai Kumar
2001: K. M. Binu
2002: K. M. Binu
2003: P. S. Primesh Kumar
2004: Josemon Mathew
2005: Ghamanda Ram

1500 metres
1988: P. Sholamuthu
1989: Bahadur Prasad
1990: Bahadur Prasad
1991: Ram Niwas
1992: Bahadur Prasad
1993: Bahadur Prasad
1994: 
1995: ?
1996: Virender Singh
1997: ?
1998: Bahadur Prasad
1999: Gulab Chand
2000: Kuldeep Kumar
2001: T. M. Sanjeev
2002: Kuldeep Kumar
2003: Gulab Chand
2004: C. Hamza
2005: Pritam Bind
2019: Ajay Kumar Saroj
2021: Parvej Khan 
2022 : Parvej Khan

5000 metres
1988: K. M. Suresh
1989: Bahadur Prasad
1990: Vijay Kumar
1991: Madan Singh
1992: Leela Ram
1993: Bahadur Prasad
1994: 
1995: ?
1996: Gulab Chand
1997: ?
1998: Gulab Chand
1999: N. Gojen Singh
2000: Gulab Chand
2001: Krishnan Shankar
2002: Shiva Nanda
2003: Gulab Chand
2004: Jagannath Lakade
2005: Jagannath Lakade

10,000 metres
1988: E. Rajendra
1989: Bahadur Prasad
1990: Danvir Singh
1991: Madan Singh
1992: Madan Singh
1993: Narinder Singh
1994: Bahadur Prasad
1995: ?
1996: Gulab Chand
1997: ?
1998: Krishnan Shankar
1999: N. Gojen Singh
2000: Harish Tiwari
2001: Krishnan Shankar
2002: Aman Saini
2003: I. Shivananda
2004: Jagannath Lakade
2005: Jagannath Lakade

Marathon
2005: H. A. Chinnappa

3000 metres steeplechase
1988: P. Sholamuthu
1989: Deena Ram
1990: Deena Ram
1991: Deena Ram
1992: Deena Ram
1993: Balkar Singh
1994: 
1995: ?
1996: Narinder Singh
1997: ?
1998: Arun D'Souza
1999: Amrish Kumar
2000: Arun D'Souza
2001: Arun D'Souza
2002: Arun D'Souza
2003: Arun D'Souza
2004: Arun D'Souza
2005: Arun D'Souza

110 metres hurdles
1988: Vijay Kumar
1989: Ashish Mondal
1990: Ashish Mondal
1991: Ashish Mondal
1992: Benny John
1993: Dharmendra Singh
1994: 
1995: ?
1996: Dharminder Kumar Sharma
1997: ?
1998: P. T. Yesudoss
1999: P. T. Yesudoss
2000: Gurpreet Singh
2001: Gurpreet Singh
2002: P. T. Yesudoss
2003: Gurpreet Singh
2004: K. Krishna Mohan
2005: Naunidh Singh

400 metres hurdles
1988: Surinder Singh
1989: C. Haridas
1990: Bhuvan Singh
1991: Bhuvan Singh
1992: Bhuvan Singh
1993: Rajender Singh
1994: Rajiv Gupta
1995: ?
1996: Sahib Singh
1997: ?
1998: Sahib Singh
1999: Mandeep Singh
2000: K. P. Vishakamani
2001: Gurpreet Singh
2002: Shebin Joseph
2003: Vara Prasad Reddy
2004: Patlavath Shankar
2005: Joseph Abraham

High jump
1988: Nalluswamy Annavi
1989: Nalluswamy Annavi
1990: Nalluswamy Annavi
1991: Nalluswamy Annavi
1992: Nalluswamy Annavi
1993: Chander Pal Ratni
1994: Chander Pal Ratni
1995: ?
1996: Sunil Kumar Azad
1997: ?
1998: S. Arumugam Pillai
1999: Juby Thomas
2000: Kakkad Razack Roshan
2001: Maria Lorans
2002: Mahesh Kumar
2003: Hari Shankar Roy
2004: Benedict Starli
2005: Hari Shankar Roy

Pole vault
1988: Vijay Pal Singh
1989: Vijay Pal Singh
1990: M. A. Eldo
1991: Vijay Pal Singh
1992: M. A. Eldo
1993: M. A. Eldo
1994: M. A. Eldo
1995: MUKESH SINGH
1996: Sat Pal Saini
1997: M. A. Eldo
1998: Ramdhari Singh
1999: Jitendra Kumar Singh
2000: Shyam Sekhar Singh
2001: Ramdhari Singh
2002: V. V. Geesh Kumar
2003: Jitendra Kumar Singh
2004: Gajanan Upadhyay
2005: V. V. Geesh Kumar

Long jump
1988: Shyam Kumar Sunder
1989: Praveen Fernandez
1990: Shyam Kumar Sunder
1991: Shyam Kumar Sunder
1992: Shyam Kumar Sunder
1993: Shyam Kumar Sunder
1994: Shyam Kumar Sunder
1995: ?
1996: Amit Kumar Saha
1997: ?
1998: Sanjay Kumar Rai
1999: B. S. Vinod
2000: Amit Kumar Saha
2001: Sanjay Kumar Rai
2002: Shiv Shanker Yadav
2003: Sanjay Kumar Rai
2004: Maha Singh
2005: Shiv Shanker Yadav

Triple jump
1988: Murali Sridharan
1989: Mohamed Nizamuddin
1990: Mohamed Nizamuddin
1991: Mohamed Nizamuddin
1992: Satnam Singh
1993: Rajinder Singh
1994: T. M. Martin
1995: ?
1996: Bobby George
1997: ?
1998: Premchandra Singh
1999: P. D. Venkaiah
2000: Amarjit Singh
2001: Sanjay Kumar Rai
2002: Amarjit Singh
2003: Sanjay Dewadi
2004: Amarjit Singh
2005: Renjith Maheshwary

Shot put
1988: Balwinder Singh
1989: Shirappa D. Eashan
1990: Shirappa D. Eashan
1991: Satkaran Singh
1992: Manjeet Singh
1993: Satkaran Singh
1994: 
1995: ?
1996: Jogesh Kumar Singh
1997: ?
1998: Bahadur Singh Sagoo
1999: Shakti Singh
2000: Jaiveer Singh
2001: Bahadur Singh Sagoo
2002: Shakti Singh
2003: Bahadur Singh Sagoo
2004: Ranvijay Singh
2005: Navpreet Singh

Discus throw
1988: Sarjit Singh
1989: Shakti Singh
1990: Manjeet Singh
1991: Shakti Singh
1992: Ajit Bhaduria
1993: Shakti Singh
1994: 
1995: ?
1996: Ajit Bhaduria
1997: ?
1998: Anil Kumar
1999: Shakti Singh
2000: Krishna Kumar Sharma
2001: Anil Kumar
2002: Hridayanand Singh
2003: Anil sangwan
2004: Sukhveer Singh
2005: Amritpal Singh

Hammer throw
1988: Piarey Lal
1989: Raghubir Singh Bal
1990: Jasdev Singh Waraich
1991: Hari Prasad Rajesh Bhardwaj
1992: Om Prakash
1993: Hari Prasad Rajesh Bhardwaj
1994: Hari Prasad Rajesh Bhardwaj
1995: ?
1996: Anoop Singh Punia
1997: ?
1998: Virender Singh Punia
1999: Pramod Kumar Tiwari
2000: Rupinder Pal Singh
2001: Pramod Kumar Tiwari
2002: Pramod Kumar Tiwari
2003: Pramod Kumar Tiwari
2004: Harpal Singh
2005: Nirbhay Singh

Javelin throw
1988: Shyamdar Batuk Mishra
1989: Shyamdar Batuk Mishra
1990: Shyamdar Batuk Mishra
1991: Satbir Singh Saran
1992: Satbir Singh Saran
1993: Yusuf Khan
1994: 
1995: ?
1996: Jagdish Kumar Bishnoi
1997: ?
1998: Jagdish Kumar Bishnoi
1999: Ramandeep Singh
2000: Om Prakash Dudi
2001: Jagdish Kumar Bishnoi
2002: Harminder Singh
2003: Fazal Ansari
2004: Gajendra Kumar
2005: Anil Kumar

Decathlon
1988: Satyadev Singh
1989: Babu Shetty
1990: T. K. Sebastian
1991: T. K. Sebastian
1992: Anil Kumar Singh
1993: Anil Kumar Singh
1994: Anil Kumar Singh
1995: ?
1996: A. D. Ganpathi
1997: ?
1998: Jagdish Singh
1999: Kulwinder Singh
2000: Kulwinder Singh
2001: Kulwinder Singh
2002: Kulwinder Singh
2003: Kulwinder Singh
2004: Kulwinder Singh
2005: Kulwinder Singh

20 kilometres walk
The event was held on a track from 2002 to 2004.
1996: Gurdeep Singh
1997: ?
1998: Sudhir Nandyal
1999: Gurdev Singh
2000: Amrik Singh
2001: Gurdev Singh
2002: Sitaram Basat
2003: Sitaram Basat
2004: Vijaykumar Gehlot
2005: Gurmeet Singh

50 kilometres walk
2005: Gurdev Singh

Women

100 metres
1988: Zenia Ayrton
1989: P. T. Usha
1990: Ashwini Nachappa
1991: Ashwini Nachappa
1992: Zenia Ayrton
1993: Zenia Ayrton
1994: 
1995: ?
1996: E. B. Shyla
1997: ?
1998: Rachita Mistry
1999: P. T. Usha
2000: Saraswati Saha
2001: Kavitha Pandya
2002: Saraswati Saha
2003: Saraswati Saha
2004: Poonam Tomar
2005: Poonam Tomar

200 metres
1988: Ashwini Nachappa
1989: Ashwini Nachappa
1990: Ashwini Nachappa
1991: Ashwini Nachappa
1992: Zenia Ayrton
1993: Kutty Saramma
1994: 
1995: ?
1996: T. Lavanya Reddy
1997: ?
1998: Vinitha Tripathi
1999: P. T. Usha
2000: V. Pandeeshwari
2001: Kavitha Pandya
2002: Saraswati Saha
2003: Saraswati Saha
2004: Manjeet Kaur
2005: Babita B. Singh

400 metres
1988: Mercy Kuttan
1989: P. T. Usha
1990: P. T. Usha
1991: Ashwini Nachappa
1992: Shiny Abraham
1993: Kutty Saramma
1994: 
1995: ?
1996: Jyotirmoyee Sikdar
1997: ?
1998: Jyotirmoyee Sikdar
1999: K. M. Beenamol
2000: K. M. Beenamol
2001: K. M. Beenamol
2002: K. M. Beenamol
2003: Pinki Pramanik
2004: Sathi Geetha
2005: Pinki Pramanik

800 metres
1988: Rosa Kutty
1989: Shiny Abraham
1990: Rosa Kutty
1991: Alphonsa P. Rayan
1992: Shiny Abraham
1993: Shiny Abraham
1994: 
1995: ?
1996: Rosa Kutty
1997: ?
1998: Jyotirmoyee Sikdar
1999: Rosa Kutty
2000: Inderjeet Kaur
2001: C. Latha
2002: K. M. Beenamol
2003: Sunita
2004: Sunita Kumari
2005: Pinki Pramanik

1500 metres
1988: Vijay Neelmani Khalko
1989: Rosa Kutty
1990: Rosa Kutty
1991: Aparna Bhoyar
1992: Aparna Bhoyar
1993: Jyotirmoyee Sikdar
1994: Jyotirmoyee Sikdar
1995: ?
1996: Vaishali Fating
1997: ?
1998: Sunita Rani
1999: Sunita Rani
2000: K. P. Sudha
2001: Sunita Dahiya
2002: Harjeet Kaur
2003: Sunita Rani
2004: Sunita Kumari
2005: Orchatteri Puthiyavgetil Jaisha

3000 metres
1988: Vijay Neelmani Khalko
1989: Molly Chacko
1990: Molly Chacko
1991: Lukose Leelamma
1992: Molly Chacko
1993: Aparna Bhoyar
1994:

5000 metres
1996: Madhuri A. Saxena
1997: ?
1998: Sunita Rani
1999: Sunita Rani
2000: Molly Biju
2001: Madhuri Gurnule
2002: Pumpa Chanda
2003: Madhuri Gurnule
2004: Preeja Sridharan
2005: Orchatteri Puthiyavgetil Jaisha

10,000 metres
1988: Nanda Jadhav
1989: ?
1990: Nanda Jadhav
1991: Vally Sathyabhama
1992: Lukose Leelamma
1993: Lukose Leelamma
1994: Lukose Leelamma
1995: ?
1996: Raini Saini
1997: ?
1998: Pushpa Devi
1999: Molly Biju
2000: Reena Das
2001: Madhuri Gurnule
2002: Lashram Aruna Devi
2003: Lashram Aruna Devi
2004: Lashram Aruna Devi
2005: Lashram Aruna Devi

3000 metres steeplechase
2003: B. Hemalatha
2004: B. L. Bharathi
2005: L. Manjula

100 metres hurdles
1988: Kum Kum Mondal
1989: Reeth Abraham
1990: Vimla Singh
1991: Vimla Singh
1992: Anuradha Biswal
1993: Kamala K. Geetha
1994: Kamala K. Geetha
1995: ?
1996: Debi Bose
1997: ?
1998: Debi Bose
1999: Anuradha Biswal
2000: Debi Dey
2001: Anuradha Biswal
2002: Anuradha Biswal
2003: Kadayam Natrajan Priya
2004: Soma Biswas
2005: Anuradha Biswal

400 metres hurdles
1988: Kum Kum Mondal
1989: Shantimol Philips
1990: Shantimol Philips
1991: Shantimol Philips
1992: Sylvina Pais
1993: Sylvina Pais
1994: 
1995: ?
1996: M. K. Asha
1997: ?
1998: Lissamma Joseph
1999: Sahebani Oram
2000: Asik Bebi
2001: Sahebani Oram
2002: S. Rosalin Arockia Mary
2003: Chitra Soman
2004: Babita Choudhary
2005: Pooja Jakhar

High jump
1988: Angela Lincy
1989: Angela Lincy
1990: Angela Lincy
1991: Angela Lincy
1992: P. S. Bindu
1993: Angela Lincy
1994: P. S. Bindu
1995: ?
1996: Bobby Aloysius
1997: ?
1998: Bobby Aloysius
1999: S. Jayanthi
2000: A. K. Deepa
2001: Mohan Sangeetha
2002: Sarita Patil
2003: Sahana Kumari
2004: Sahana Kumari
2005: Tessymol Joseph

Pole vault
1999: Anupama
2000: Karamjeet Kaur
2001: Karamjeet Kaur
2002: Karamjeet Kaur
2003: V. S. Surekha
2004: V. S. Surekha
2005: Chetna Solanki

Long jump
1988: Rekhai Lal
1989: Reeth Abraham
1990: Reeth Abraham
1991: Reeth Abraham
1992: Lekha Thomas
1993: Mujeetha Begum
1994: 
1995: ?
1996: M. Madhavi
1997: ?
1998: Lekha Thomas
1999: Anju Bobby Markose
2000: G. Pramila Ganapathy
2001: G. Pramila Ganapathy
2002: Anju Bobby George
2003: J. J. Shobha
2004: G. Pramila Ganapathy
2005: M. A. Prajusha

Triple jump
1996: Lekha Thomas
1997: ?
1998: Lekha Thomas
1999: Reena Thomas
2000: Manisha Dey
2001: Lekha Roy
2002: Manisha Dey
2003: Manisha Dey
2004: Tincy Philip
2005: Tessymol Joseph

Shot put
1988: Rajwinder Kaur
1989: Rajwinder Kaur
1990: Mukti Das
1991: Mukti Das
1992: Amandeep Kaur
1993: Amandeep Kaur
1994: Amandeep Kaur
1995: ?
1996: Harbans Kaur
1997: ?
1998: Harbans Kaur
1999: Saroj Sihad Kumari
2000: Surinderjeet Kaur
2001: Nicholas Latha
2002: Nicholas Latha
2003: Nicholas Latha
2004: Nicholas Latha
2005: Nicholas Latha

Discus throw
1988: Gurmeet Kaur
1989: Neelam Kumari
1990: Neelam Jaswant Singh
1991: Harpreet Kaur
1992: Baljeet Kaur
1993: Neelam Jaswant Singh
1994: 
1995: ?
1996: Neelam Jaswant Singh
1997: ?
1998: Neelam Jaswant Singh
1999: Neelam Jaswant Singh
2000: Seema Punia
2001: Neelam Jaswant Singh
2002: Neelam Jaswant Singh
2003: Neelam Jaswant Singh
2004: Neelam Jaswant Singh
2005: Saroj Sihag

Hammer throw
1996: Surinderjeet Kaur
1997: Bhupinder Singh
1998: K. Jebeshori Devi
1999: K. Jebeshori Devi
2000: Hardeep Kaur
2001: Hardeep Kaur
2002: Hardeep Kaur
2003: Hardeep Kaur
2004: Archana Bara
2005: Ritu Rani

Javelin throw
1988: Shiny Verghese
1989: Razia Sheikh
1990: Razia Sheikh
1991: Razia Sheikh
1992: Gurbari Hembran
1993: Gurmeet Kaur
1994: Sushama Behera
1995: ?
1996: Gurmeet Kaur
1997: Bupinder Singh
1998: Gurmeet Kaur
1999: Manisha Mondal
2000: Gurmeet Kaur
2001: Manisha Mondal
2002: Gurmeet Kaur
2003: Gurmeet Kaur
2004: Megha Pardeshi
2005: Gurmeet Kaur

Heptathlon
1988: Jolly Joseph
1989: Kamala K. Geetha
1990: Kamala K. Geetha
1991: Kamala K. Geetha
1992: Kamala K. Geetha
1993: Kamala K. Geetha
1994: R. Chitra
1995: ?
1996: B. N. Sumavathy
1997: ?
1998: G. Pramila Ganapathy
1999: G. Pramila Ganapathy
2000: Soma Biswas
2001: Soma Biswas
2002: P. Bindu
2003: J. J. Shobha
2004: Sushmitha Singha Roy
2005: M. P. Sinimol

10 kilometres walk
1996: Jiji Jose
1997: ?
1998: Paramjeet Kaur
1999: Jasmin Kaur
2000: Yumnam Bala Devi

20 kilometres walk
The event was held on a track from 2002 to 2004.
2001: Jasmin Kaur
2002: Yumnam Bala Devi
2003: Jasmin Kaur
2004: Yumnam Bala Devi
2005: Amandeep Kaur

References

Champions 1960–2006
Indian Championships. GBR Athletics. Retrieved 2021-04-22.

Winners
 List
Indian Championships
Athletics